Castlemaine Secondary College is a state secondary school located in the town of Castlemaine in central Victoria, Australia which caters for approximately 630 students from Years 7 to 12.  It is the only state secondary school in the Mount Alexander Shire.

Notable alumni
 Sean Finning (born 1985), Australian professional cyclist and gold medalist at the 2006 Melbourne Commonwealth Games
 Kian (born Kian Brownfield, 2002), singer-songwriter

References

Secondary schools in Victoria (Australia)